Clay Township is a township in Shelby County, Iowa. There are 663 people and 16.8 people per square mile in Clay Township. The total area is 39.6 square miles.

References

Townships in Shelby County, Iowa
Townships in Iowa